Ronald Kenneth Gans (August 9, 1931 – June 29, 2010), sometimes credited as Ron Kennedy, was an American character actor and voice-over artist, known for portraying Q.T. the Orangutan on The Disney Channel's Dumbo's Circus, the voice of Armus in Star Trek: The Next Generation, the voice of Eeyore on Welcome to Pooh Corner, and the voice of the Spider in The Mother Goose Video Treasury.

Career
Gans also voiced the Stunticon Drag Strip in The Transformers. His work as a character actor, billed as "Ron Kennedy," includes the Perry Mason episode "The Case of the Traveling Treasure," first aired on CBS on November 4, 1961, and the Straightaway episode "Pledge a Nightmare," first aired on ABC on December 1, 1961.

Personal life
Gans was married to Theresa Gans, together they had two children.

Death
Gans died in Los Angeles at the age of 78, due to complications from pneumonia.

Filmography

References

External links
 

1931 births
2010 deaths
American male voice actors
University of Southern California alumni
Deaths from pneumonia in California